The Downtown Jacksonville Multiple Property Submission is a Multiple Property Submission (MPS) of historic buildings to the National Register of Historic Places in Jacksonville, Florida. It consists of eleven properties in Downtown Jacksonville that were added to the National Register between 1992 and 2007.

See also
National Register of Historic Places listings in Duval County, Florida

Notes

References
 Duval County listings at National Register of Historic Places
 Duval County listings at Florida's Office of Cultural and Historical Programs

Buildings and structures in Jacksonville, Florida
National Register of Historic Places Multiple Property Submissions in Florida
National Register of Historic Places in Jacksonville, Florida